They Wait is a 2007 Canadian horror film directed by Ernie Barbarash. It stars Jaime King as a mother attempting to find the truth and save her son when threatened by spirits during the Chinese tradition of Ghost Month. The other leading star is Chinese Canadian actor Terry Chen, who plays her husband. It was both filmed, and set, in the city of Vancouver, in British Columbia in Canada, and was featured at the 2007 Toronto International Film Festival.

Plot

Married couple Sarah (King) and Jason (Chen), and son Sammy (Oey), travel to Vancouver for the funeral of Uncle Raymond (Foo). During this time, Sammy begins to see ghosts and falls gravely ill, his illness coinciding with the Chinese festival of Ghost Month. After traditional western medicine fails to help Sammy, Sarah turns to a mysterious pharmacist who tells her that her son is held in a death grip by a living corpse. Sarah now must find what the spirits want before the last day of Ghost Month, or Sammy will be lost forever.

Cast
Terry Chen as Jason
Jaime King as Sarah
Regan Oey as Sammy
Cheng Pei-pei as Aunt Mei
Henry O as Pharmacist
Colin Foo as Raymond
Chang Tseng as Xiang
Vicky Huang as Shen
Michael Biehn as Blake
Donald Fong as Ben
Wally Houn as Pang
Stephen M.D. Chang as Funeral Director
Donny Lucas as Sam's Doctor
Suzanne Bastien as Nurse #1
Erika Conway as Nurse #2
Grace Fatkin as Receptionist
Joseph May as Paramedic
Yee Jee Tso as Pharmacy Store Clerk
Paul Wu as Young Raymond
Maggie Ma as Young Mei
Nelson Wong as Young Ben
Vincent Tong as Young Xiang
Igor Ingelsman as Worker

Production
They Wait was filmed on location in Vancouver in March 2007.

Reception

Joe Leydon of Variety wrote that "Director Ernie Barbarash makes judicious use of CGI trickery -- in one key scene, he cleverly shocks his audience into laughing -- but at heart, he's an old-school traditionalist when it comes to scary stuff." The Toronto Star and ReelFilm both panned the film, with ReelFilm's David Nusair saying that They Wait is "...a tedious and downright silly piece of work."

References

External links
 
 
 They Wait at the 2007 Toronto International Film Festival
 

2007 films
Canadian supernatural horror films
Films set in Vancouver
Films shot in Vancouver
2007 horror films
Brightlight Pictures films
Films directed by Ernie Barbarash
English-language Canadian films
2000s English-language films
2000s Canadian films